Bilal Abbas Khan (born 4 June 1993) is a Pakistani actor who primarily works in Urdu television. He made his acting debut with a supporting role in the religious drama Saya-e-Dewar Bhi Nahi (2016). 

His debut in a leading role was in Kashif Nisar Dumpukht – Aatish-e-Ishq (2016). Khan appeared in the romantic drama O Rangreza (2017). He recently acted in the family drama Dobara (TV series) (2021).

Early life
Bilal Abbas Khan was born on 4 June 1993 into a Pashtun family in Karachi, Sindh. There he was also raised and received his early education from, but was later on sent to a boarding school, called Lawrence School, in Murree, where he took part in theater plays, which inspired a desire in him to pursue a career in acting. He later joined the Shaheed Zulfikar Ali Bhutto Institute of Science and Technology in Karachi, to study marketing, and graduated in 2015. His father, Sohail Abbas, serves as DSP Karachi in the Sindh Police, and his mother, Farhana Sohail, is a fashion designer. Having formally studied acting at the National Academy of Performing Arts and being mainly inspired by Viola Spolin's "great focus on improvisation and improvisational techniques", he started acting in 2016 with commercial modelling and later started auditioning for television roles.

Career 
Khan made his acting debut in 2016, with a supporting role in the Hum TV's religious drama Saya-e-Dewar Bhi Nahi, alongside an ensemble cast of Naveen Waqar, Ahsan Khan and Emmad Irfani. Directed by Shahzad Kashmiri, his role was that of a spoiled brat who hated his parents for neglecting and abandoning him. Khan received praise for portraying a man betrayed by his elder brother (played by Sami Khan) by marrying his love interest (played by Armeena Khan) in the romantic drama Rasm E Duniya, that aired on ARY Digital in 2017. His next role was that of a murdered victim in the courtroom drama Saanp Seerhi. The series was based on the novel of the same name, written by Umera Ahmed, and also starred Samina Peerzada and Madiha Imam, who played his mother and love interest respectively. His breakout role came with the romantic comedy drama O Rangreza (2017), in which he starred as an introvert, raised by his strict uncle (Noman Ijaz), who falls in love with his daughter (Sajal Aly). Mahwash Ajaz of Samaa wrote that Khan portrayed his character without "being repetitive" and that he is the "master of [his] craft". The series topped the rating upon its airing and earned him further recognition, as well as the Hum Award for Best Supporting Actor nomination. Further success came with the role of a family-oriented guy married to a selfish wife (played by Ushna Shah) in the thriller Balaa (2018), which earned him the ARY Media Awards for Best Actor and a Lux Style Award for Best Television Actor nomination. Daily Times called him the "master performer of this age", and ARY News said that "Bilal continues to go from strength to strength" and labeled him as an "amazing actor".

The 2019 crime drama Cheekh, was one of the most successful and acclaimed dramas of 2019. His role of an antagonist opposite Saba Qamar, was well-received by the critics as well as by the public, establishing Khan as a leading actor in Urdu television. Daily Times stated that Khan is "scary as the coldblooded murderer", while Mangobaaz labelled him as "a modern day masterpiece". At the annual Lux Style Awards, he received another Best Television Actor nomination. He next starred as a Naval officer in the patriotic military-based telefilm Laal, which was aired on television on the occasion of Pakistan Day.

Khan began 2020 with the role of a dumb but Mathematics genius in the comedy drama Pyar Ke Sadqay, opposite Yumna Zaidi. The series as well as his performance was widely praised by the public and the critics. The Nation said that Khan has raised the "bar high" for his performance in the series. His next appearance was opposite Madiha Imam in Mehreen Jabbar's social comedy web-series Aik Jhooti Love Story, as a computer hardware technician who unknowingly romances his neighbour through an online profile with a fake persona. The web-series, written by Umera Ahmed, was streamed on the Indian video on demand service, called Zee5. Critical opinion on his acting prowess was overwhelming; critic Maliha Rehman of Dawn wrote, "Bilal has been proving his acting brilliance for some time now, completely personifying every character that he plays. In Aik Jhooti Love Story, he transforms completely into Sohail, bringing an earthy, very real sweetness to his role. In December 2020, he was selected by the UK magazine Eastern Eye as one of the "Top 50 Asian celebrities", peaking at number 28, along with four other Pakistani celebrities, and was labelled as the "fastest rising acting star in Pakistan" by the magazine. Khan concluded the year with the #MeToo movement-based thriller series Dunk, where he played the hot-headed love interest of Sana Javed's character, alongside her, Noman Ijaz, and Yasra Rizvi. Khan described his character as "a very realistic one. Haider is an honest guy who stands with the truth and fights for what is right." Based on a real-life story of a family in Sargodha, Dunk generated controversy when its producer, Fahad Mustafa, stated against the sexual harassment cases, citing that many of the men are falsely accused. Muna Moini of Something Haute found the series to be "a multi-layered drama full of powerful performances." In 2021, Eastern Eye featured him in its list of "30 under 30 Global Asian Stars", along with four other Pakistani celebrities. As of February 2021, he has confirmed to play the lead in his second film, titled as Khel Khel Mein, opposite Sajal Aly, which will be directed by Nabeel Qureshi.

Television

Web

Filmography

Telefilm

Awards and nominations

References

External links 
 
 
 

1993 births
People from Karachi
Male actors from Karachi
People from Sindh
Living people
Pakistani male television actors
Pakistani male film actors
Pakistani stage actors
Hum Award winners
Lawrence College Ghora Gali alumni
National Academy of Performing Arts alumni